Connecticut's 47th House of Representatives district elects one member of the Connecticut House of Representatives. It consists of the communities of Canterbury, Chaplin, Franklin, Hampton, Lisbon (part), Lebanon (part), Norwich (part), Scotland, and Sprague. It has been represented by Republican Doug Dubitsky since 2015.

Recent elections

2020

2018

2016

2014

2012

References

47